Vegacervera is a municipality located in the province of León, Castile and León, Spain. According to the 2004 census (INE), the municipality has a population of 334 inhabitants.

The Hoces de Vegacervera is a natural landscape, which takes its name from the municipality.
It is protected as an Espacio natural and a Special Area of Conservation. 
Wildlife includes the rare Kerry slug.

See also
 Province of León
 Montes de León
 Cave of Valporquero

References

External links
 Patrimonio Natural de Castilla y León

Municipalities in the Province of León